Dendrobium anosmum (unscented dendrobium) is a species of epiphytic orchid. It is widespread across Southeast Asia from Sri Lanka to New Guinea, including Indochina, Indonesia, the Philippines, etc. In 1839, the scented variety was first discovered by Lindley in the Philippines and named Dendrobium macrophyllum, which later on considered as homonym of other species. Six years later, the unscented variety was discovered again in the Philippines, hence, the botanical nomenclature until to this date.

In the Philippines, it is locally known as Sanggumay, a coined Tagalog term for masangsang (overpowering scent) and nakakaumay  (tiresome).  Other local term includes Latigo (horsewhip) referring to its long pendulous canes which became deciduous before flowering.

References

External links
 Dendrobium Superbum (Photos).

anosmum
Flora of tropical Asia
Plants described in 1845